Ponoka-Rimbey was a provincial electoral district in Alberta mandated to return a single member to the Legislative Assembly of Alberta using the first past the post method of voting from 1986 to 2004.

Ponoka-Rimby is named for the Town of Ponoka, Alberta and the Town of Rimbey, Alberta.

Members of the Legislative Assembly (MLAs)

Electoral history

1986 general election

1989 general election

1993 general election

1997 general election

2001 general election

See also
List of Alberta provincial electoral districts
Ponoka, Alberta, a town in Alberta
Rimbey, Alberta, a town in Alberta

References

Further reading

External links
Elections Alberta
The Legislative Assembly of Alberta

Former provincial electoral districts of Alberta